The Autovía V-21 or Autovía de Acceso Norte a Valencia (Valencia North Access Autovía) is a Spanish autovía located in the province of Valencia. It travels from the A-7 to Valencia City.

References 

V-21
Transport in Valencia
Transport in the Valencian Community